Paul De Laire Staines (born 11 February 1967) is a British-Irish right-wing political blogger who publishes the Guido Fawkes website, which was described by The Daily Telegraph as "one of Britain's leading political blogsites" in 2007. The Sun on Sunday newspaper published a weekly Guido Fawkes column from 2013 to 2016. Born and raised in England, Staines holds British and Irish citizenship.

Staines acquired an interest in politics as a libertarian in the 1980s and did public relations for acid house parties in the early 1990s. He then spent several years in finance, first as a broker then as a trader. In 2001, he sued his fund's financial backer in a commercial dispute. Consequently, Staines declared himself bankrupt in October 2003 after two years of litigation, and legal costs on both sides running into hundreds of thousands of pounds.

In September 2004, Staines started publishing his political blog Guido Fawkes. The blog was named after the Spanish name for Guy Fawkes, an English Catholic involved in the failed Gunpowder Plot to assassinate King James I in 1605.

Early life 
Paul De Laire Staines was born in Ealing, London, to Irish-born Mary (née Cronin) and Indian-born Terril De Laire Staines. Staines' father was a Fabian who went to work for John Lewis because it was a cooperative; he is from Jhansi, Uttar Pradesh. Staines' mother is from a working-class background and grew up in Finglas, Dublin.

Staines grew up in Sudbury, London. Raised a Catholic, he attended Salvatorian College Catholic grammar school in Harrow. Subsequently, he read business information studies at the Humberside College of Higher Education, but did not complete the course. While a student there Staines wrote to an organiser of the British National Party proposing joint "direct action" to disrupt the meetings of leftwing students.

He was a member of the Social Democratic Party, sitting on the national executive of its youth wing, and the Conservative Party. Whilst studying at college in Hull in the 1980s, he was a member of the Federation of Conservative Students.

Staines lives in Ireland and was a member of the now defunct Irish political party, the Progressive Democrats.

Politics 
Staines is a libertarian who described in a 2000 publication, how he became a libertarian in 1980 after reading Karl Popper's The Open Society and its Enemies. He joined the Young Conservatives whilst at Humberside College of Higher Education, "because they were the only people around who were anti-Socialist or at least anti-Soviet". Having joined the Federation of Conservative Students, he described his politics as "Thatcher on drugs". He relates that at college he was a "right-wing pain in the butt who was more interested in student politics than essays", who went on "to work in the various right-wing pressure groups and think tanks that proliferated in the late eighties". He once said, "I never wore a 'Hang Mandela' badge, but I hung out with people who did".

Staines was active in the Libertarian Alliance. He was pictured at the 1987 Libertarian Alliance conference with a T-shirt supporting UNITA, produced by his Popular Propaganda enterprise (while at college), which produced posters and T-shirts. Staines worked as "foreign policy analyst" for the Committee for a Free Britain, a right-wing Conservative pressure group, alongside David Hart. Staines acted as editor of British Briefing, a long-standing publication by the group that was a "monthly intelligence analysis of the activities of the extreme left" that sought to "smear Labour MPs and left-leaning lawyers and writers".

Staines relates of his work with the committee:
I was lobbying at the Council of Europe and at Parliament; I was over in Washington, in Jo'burg, in South America. It was 'let's get guns for the Contras', that sort of stuff. I was enjoying it immensely, I got to go with these guys and fire off AK-47s. I always like to go where the action is, and for that period in the Reagan/Thatcher days, it was great fun, it was all expenses paid and I got to see the world. I used to think that World Briefing was a bit funny. The only scary thing about those publications was the mailing listpeople like George Bushand the fact that Hart would talk to the head of British Intelligence for an hour. I used to think it was us having a laugh, putting some loony right-wing sell in, and that somebody somewhere was taking it seriously. You've got to understand that we had a sense of humour about this.

In 1989, Staines published In the Grip of the Sandinistas: Human Rights in Nicaragua 1979–1989, under the auspices of the International Society for Human Rights (of which he was UK secretary-general), analysing the Sandinistas in Nicaragua from 1979 to 1989. He was then the editor of a series of papers called the Human Rights Defenders Briefing Papers.

In August 2011, Staines —who writes the political blog Guido Fawkes and heads the Restore Justice Campaign—launched an e-petition on the Downing Street website calling for the restoration of the death penalty for those convicted of the murder of children and police officers. The petition was one of several in support or opposition of capital punishment to be published by the government with the launch of its e-petitions website. Petitions attracting 100,000 signatures would prompt a parliamentary debate on a particular topic, but not necessarily lead to any Parliamentary Bills being put forward. When the petition closed on 4 February 2012 it had received 26,351 signatures in support of restoring capital punishment,

Staines described his political journey in an interview in 2013, "I was "anarcho-capitalist, [then] libertarian, then pragmatic libertarian." He went on to say his ideology was now closer to the Conservatives and UKIP. He supports Brexit.

Guido Fawkes

Criminal convictions 
Staines has four alcohol-related convictions  In 2002, Staines was banned from driving for 12 months for drink driving. When he was convicted of the same offence six years later, he was asked in court by District Judge Timothy Stone whether he had an alcohol problem and replied: "Possibly." He was banned from driving for three years, as well as being given an 18-month supervision order and wearing an electronic tag for three months.

Business interests 
In 2006, Staines along with Jag Singh co-founded MessageSpace, a digital advertising agency which operates an advertising network representing dozens of leading political websites. In 2012 it advised the successful Boris Johnson London mayoral campaign. Private Eye reported in June 2012 that MessageSpace was advising the Russian Embassy in London on using social media.

Global & General Nominees Limited (GGN) publishes the Guido Fawkes website and is based in the tax haven of Saint Kitts and Nevis. Staines describes himself as an "adviser" to GGN and stated that the company is based in Saint Kitts and Nevis as a "litigation shield".

Personal life 
Staines is married to Orla, a solicitor who works for an investment bank in the City of London. They have two daughters. Staines and his family also hold Irish citizenship.

References

Further reading 
 —Staines features in this book written by Collin, the ex-editor of UK trend bible i-D magazine.

1967 births
Living people
English people of Indian descent
English people of Irish descent
English bloggers
English libertarians
English social commentators
Irish libertarians
Anonymous bloggers
English male writers
Progressive Democrats
Social Democratic Party (UK) people
Alumni of the University of Lincoln
British male bloggers
Irish bloggers
People from Ealing